Atlantis The Royal, Dubai is a hotel resort at the Palm Jumeirah, Dubai in the United Arab Emirates.

Hotel 
The 795 room, 17 restaurant resort has the world’s largest jellyfish aquarium.

See also 
 Beyoncé 2023 Dubai performance
 Dubai World
 Atlantis The Palm
 List of hotels in Dubai
 Atlantis Paradise Island – similar looking hotel by Sol Kerzner

References

External links 

Aquaria in the United Arab Emirates
Palm Jumeirah
Resorts in Dubai
Seaside resorts in the United Arab Emirates